is a multiplatform turn-based historic strategy video game made by Koei for the SNES, NEC PC-9801, and PlayStation console devices.

The game is set in ancient China during the Chu-Han Contention between Liu Bang and Xiang Yu in the 3rd century BC.

Gameplay

The gameplay and control are quite unlike the similarly themed Romance of the Three Kingdoms or Nobunaga's Ambition series. The commands are set in four weeks during one month. The player must first choose the "planning" stage where they can decide to improve their cities or make allies. The next week is called the "Action" stage where the player choose where to move their armies.

The player plays as either Liu Bang or Xiang Yu. Liu Bang has below average stats for Politics and Skills however his Charisma is high and hence it is easy for him to make allies, while Xiang Yu has high personal stats while his Charisma is lower. Although the story is set during a five-year span, the player is not penalized if they don't finish the game in less than five years.

Reception

Reviewing the SNES version, Electronic Gaming Monthly commented that though action lovers would be repelled by the game's pacing, "For those who like this type of game, Rise of the Phoenix is an excellent strategic war simulation." They praised the numerous options, the music, and the cinematic sequences, and scored it a 6.8 out of 10. GamePro contended that the game's simplified interface compared to other Koei games (specifically, the lack of emphasis on city management and cash flow, and the inability to control individual fighting units), while making the game slightly more accessible to casual gamers, would be highly unsatisfying to Koei's fan base.

References

1993 video games
Video games set in the Han dynasty
Koei games
FM Towns games
NEC PC-9801 games
PlayStation (console) games
X68000 games
Super Nintendo Entertainment System games
Video games developed in Japan
Video games scored by Tomoki Hasegawa
Video games with historical settings
Multiplayer and single-player video games